Gentille was an  32-gun frigate of the French Navy.

French service
In 1779, Gentille was under Mengaud de la Haye. On 17 August 1779, she and Junon, under Bernard de Marigny, captured the 64-gun HMS Ardent.

The frigates belonged to Guichen’s squadron.

On 19 February 1781, in Chesapeake Bay, Gentille took part in the capture of the 44-gun HMS Romulus, along with the 64-gun ,  the frigate  , and the cutter , captured her in Chesapeake Bay. In September, she ferried troops from Annapolis to James River, in support of the Siege of Yorktown.

During the War of the First Coalition, Gentille cruised the Atlantic under Lieutenant Canon. She was captured by the 74-gun HMS Hannibal and Robust in the action of 10 April 1795.

Fate
Gentille was broken up in 1802.

Notes, citations, and references
Notes

Citations

References
  (1671-1870)

Age of Sail frigates of France
Ships built in France
Iphigénie-class frigates
1778 ships
Captured ships